The Prussian state railways' Class P 10 were 2-8-2 "Mikado" type passenger-hauling steam locomotives built for hauling heavy express trains in the hilly terrain of the Mittelgebirge.  They were the last Prussian passenger train steam locomotives to be developed in Prussia before the state railways were merged into the Deutsche Reichsbahn (German Imperial Railway), who eventually designated them as DRG Class 39.

The design by Borsig, under the supervision of chief engineer August Meister, was ready in 1919 but, due to material shortages, no locomotives were produced until 1922.  They were three-cylinder locomotives, all cylinders driving the second coupled axle. Three sets of Walschaerts valve gear were used, the one for the inside cylinder being mainly located inside the frame, but driven from the same eccentric crank as the valve gear on the left-hand side; two eccentric rods of different lengths being attached to the same crank. 

The locomotives' heavy axle-load exceeded the 17 tonne standard specification of much of the German rail network, so they were limited to specific lines which were constructed to higher standards. A total of 260 of these locomotives were ultimately constructed and they worked primarily on the Main-Weser-Bahn between Frankfurt and Kassel, as well as the Eifel region, the Black Forest network until their replacement by Class 221 diesel locomotives, and the Gäubahn. They were the most powerful of all the state railway passenger locomotives.

The vehicles were originally equipped with Prussian 2'2' T 31,5 tenders. The Deutsche Bundesbahn fitted many of the surviving examples with Witte smoke deflectors and 2'2' T 34 tenders. The last three engines were stabled in Stuttgart and taken out of service in 1967.

The DB Museum owns 39 230, which may be viewed currently at the German Steam Locomotive Museum.

In the East German Deutsche Reichsbahn the Prussian P 10 was indispensable and was therefore included in their reconstruction programme. The 85 Rekoloks were grouped into DR Class 22.

See also 
 Prussian state railways
 List of Prussian locomotives and railcars
 List of preserved steam engines in Germany

References 

 
 

2-8-2 locomotives
P 10
Railway locomotives introduced in 1922
Standard gauge locomotives of Germany
Borsig locomotives
1′D1′ h3 locomotives
Passenger locomotives